William Albert Gaines (born June 20, 1971) is an American former college and professional football player who was a defensive lineman in the National Football League (NFL) for four seasons during the 1990s.  Gaines played college football for the University of Florida, and thereafter, he played professionally for the Washington Redskins and Miami Dolphins of the NFL.

Early years 

Gaines was born in Jackson, Mississippi, in 1971.  He attended Lanier High School in Jackson, and played high school football for the Lanier Bulldogs.

College career 

Gaines received an athletic scholarship to attend the University of Florida in Gainesville, where he played for coach Steve Spurrier's Florida Gators football team from 1990 to 1993.  He was a member of the Gators teams that won Southeastern Conference (SEC) championships in 1991 and 1993.  As a senior team captain in 1993, Gaines was a first-team All-SEC selection, and the recipient of the Gators' Fergie Ferguson Award recognizing the "senior football player who displays outstanding leadership, character and courage."

Professional career 

In his four-season NFL career, Gaines started twenty-four of fifty-two NFL games in which he played, and recorded two quarterback sacks, one forced fumble and sixty tackles.

See also 

 Florida Gators football, 1990–99
 List of Florida Gators football All-Americans
 List of Florida Gators in the NFL Draft
 List of Miami Dolphins players
 List of Washington Redskins players

References

Bibliography 
 Carlson, Norm, University of Florida Football Vault: The History of the Florida Gators, Whitman Publishing, LLC, Atlanta, Georgia (2007).  .
 Golenbock, Peter, Go Gators!  An Oral History of Florida's Pursuit of Gridiron Glory, Legends Publishing, LLC, St. Petersburg, Florida (2002).  .
 Hairston, Jack, Tales from the Gator Swamp: A Collection of the Greatest Gator Stories Ever Told, Sports Publishing, LLC, Champaign, Illinois (2002).  .
 McCarthy, Kevin M.,  Fightin' Gators: A History of University of Florida Football, Arcadia Publishing, Mount Pleasant, South Carolina (2000).  .
 Nash, Noel, ed., The Gainesville Sun Presents The Greatest Moments in Florida Gators Football, Sports Publishing, Inc., Champaign, Illinois (1998).  .

1971 births
Living people
Players of American football from Jackson, Mississippi
American football defensive tackles
Florida Gators football players
Miami Dolphins players
Washington Redskins players
Nashville Kats players
Georgia Force players
Detroit Fury players
Orlando Predators players